0 to 1 no Aida (0と1の間; Hepburn: Zero to Ichi no Aida, Between 0 and 1) is the seventh studio album from Japanese idol girl group AKB48, released on . This album marks the tenth anniversary of the group, and contains a compilation of their top singles as well as an assortment of bonus tracks. This is the last album to feature long-time member and former AKB48 general director Minami Takahashi.

Overview 
The seventh AKB48 album was announced in September 2015, during an event, and will be a special compilation to celebrate the tenth anniversary of the Japanese idol group and the departure, or "graduation" of long-time member and former AKB48 general director Minami Takahashi.

The album was released in three versions:
 No. 1 Singles and Million Singles are two-CD editions which compile all of the groups' singles that have reached the #1 position on the Oricon charts plus three new tracks and all singles which have sold more than a million copies plus six new tracks respectively.
 Complete Singles is a three-CD bundle which includes every single released up to date (both indie singles "Sakura no Hanabiratachi" and "Skirt, Hirari" are presented in newly remixed versions) plus three new tracks and a bonus DVD.
 The Theater Edition features the same track list as Million Singles with the exception of the last three tracks, which are replaced by two new songs by sub-units Tentoumu Chu! and Dendenmu Chu!.

Track listing
All tracks written by Yasushi Akimoto.

No. 1 Singles

Million Singles

Complete Singles

Theater Edition

Release history

Chart

References

AKB48 albums
2015 compilation albums
2015 greatest hits albums